The 2017–18 Slovak Cup was the 49th edition of the competition. This tournament began on 22 July 2017. The winners of the cup, Slovan Bratislava, earned a place in the 2018–19 Europa League and would have joined the competition in the first qualifying round.

Slovan Bratislava were the defending champions having won the previous season's Cup by defeating MFK Skalica in the final by a score of 3–0.

Format
The Cup this season was a knockout tournament contested between 208 clubs. Matches which were level after regulation advanced to penalties to determine a winner. Each round of the cup was contested over one leg with the exception of the semi-finals which were contested over two legs.

Second round
Sixty-four second round matches were played from 4 August 2017 to 16 August 2017.

|}

Third round
Thirty-two matches in the third round were played from 31 August 2017 to 14 September 2017.

|}

Fourth round
Sixteen matches in the fourth round were played from 27 September 2017 to 4 October 2017.

|}

Fifth round
Eight fifth round matches were played 17–18 October 2017.

|}

Quarter-finals
Four quarter-final matches will be played 13–14 March 2018.

Semi-finals
For the semi-finals, the first legs were played on 3 and 4 April and the second on 18 April 2018. All times are CET (UTC+1).

First leg

Second leg

Final

The final was played on 1 May 2018 at the Štadión Antona Malatinského in Trnava.

See also
 2017–18 Slovak First Football League

References

External links 
 soccerway.com

Slovak Cup seasons
Cup
Slovak Cup